George Bristow may refer to:
George Bristow (ornithologist) (1863–1947), English taxidermist, gunsmith and ornithologist
George Frederick Bristow (1825–1898), American composer
George W. Bristow (1894–1961), American jurist
George Bristow (baseball) (1870–1939), American baseball player
George Bristow (footballer) (1933–2010), English footballer